Television Maldives is the public service broadcasting TV channel of the Maldives. It was formed on March 29, 1978.

In 2009, the management of Television Maldives (TVM) and national radio, Dhivehiraajjeyge Adu [Voice of Maldives] was handed over to newly formed Maldives National Broadcasting Corporation (MNBC). Following this, in 2010, TVM was rebranded as MNBC One, and Dhivehiraajjeyge Adu [Voice of Maldives] was renamed as Raajje Radio. 
Maldives National Broadcasting Corporation (MNBC) recently rebranded the name of Television Maldives (TVM) to "MNBC One." Under the rebranding process, the company also changed the name of Voice of Maldives (VOM) to "Raajje Radio." The move came days after Maldives Broadcasting Corporation (MBC) formed under Maldives Broadcasting Corporation Act announced that all the assets, employees, and land used by state media organisations belong to the company and MNBC was using the assets against law. Maldives Broadcasting Corporation (MBC) filed a lawsuit in Civil Court against Finance Ministry to procure assets, money, and employees of Television Maldives (TVM) and Voice of Maldives (VOM), at then rebranded to MNBC One and Raajje Radio.

In late 2009, MNBC launched "Youth TV", a half-day television channel that airs in the evening. This channel is aimed at the teens and youth of the Maldives. The channel is no longer airing.

After the resignation of President Mohamed Nasheed, a group of police officers with many from public have taken the MNBC Station on a court order. Soon after VTV feed was aired on the frequency. Later that day the Channel was renamed to TVM, although the radio channel kept the Raajje Radio name.

As of 8 February 2012, the station became a public service broadcaster, under the umbrella of Maldives Broadcasting Corporation (MBC).

On 30 March 2015, a bill was sent to the People’s Majlis to dissolve MBC and establish a new company to run state media, named Public Service Media or PSM for short. One of the purposes of PSM stated in the bill is to develop and sustain under expense of state budget new media, broadcasting devices, print media and all other technologies that provide news, information, awareness and entertainment. And also remaining as national media that is impartial to influence with editorial independence with nationwide coverage under the common regulations and policies within the law.

On 28 April 2015,Former President Abdulla Yameen Abdul Gayoom ratified the Public Service Media Bill, making PSM the official state media company. Following the ratification, seven individuals were nominated to the Public Service Media Governing Board by the president on 29 April 2015.

Events
Football
 Dhivehi League 
 President's Cup
 Maldivian FA Charity Shield  
 Maldives FA Cup 
 SAFF Championship

International
 FIFA World Cup
 UEFA Euro
 FIFA Club World Cup (Since 2011)
 Copa America (Since 2015)
 I-League

References

External links
 Official Website

Mass media in the Maldives
Television channels and stations established in 1978
Television channels in the Maldives
Publicly funded broadcasters
Public television